Redinger Dam (National ID # CA00440; also known as Big Creek Dam Number 7) is a dam in Fresno County, California.

The concrete gravity dam was completed in 1951 as one component of Southern California Edison's Big Creek Hydroelectric Project, a system of 25 dams, nine power plants and supporting tunnels and diversion channels in the upper basin of the San Joaquin River, one of the most extensive hydroelectric systems in the world.  Redinger Dam stands 250 feet tall, with a length of 875 feet at its crest.

The reservoir it creates, Redinger Lake, has a normal water surface of 465 acres and a maximum capacity of 35,000 acre-feet.  Recreation includes fishing (for German brown and eastern brook trout, small mouth bass, bluegill, or catfish), camping, and hiking. The dam and lake were named after David H. Redinger in a ceremony that occurred on October 24, 1955. Redinger served as superintendent of Edison's Big Creek Hydroelectric Project from its inception until his retirement in 1947.

See also 
 List of lakes in California

References

External links 
 online description with photographs

Dams in California
Reservoirs in Fresno County, California
Southern California Edison dams
Dams completed in 1951
Buildings and structures in Fresno County, California
Gravity dams
Dams on the San Joaquin River
Reservoirs in California
Reservoirs in Northern California
1951 establishments in California
Hydroelectric power plants in California